Goldshaw Booth is a civil parish in Pendle, Lancashire, England.  It contains 14 listed buildings that are recorded in the National Heritage List for England.  Of these, two are at Grade II*, the middle grade, and the others are at Grade II, the lowest grade.  The parish contains the village of Newchurch in Pendle and is otherwise rural.  Almost all the listed buildings in the parish are houses, farmhouses, farm buildings, and associated structures.  The other listed buildings are a church and two memorials in the churchyard.

Key

Buildings

Notes and references

Notes

Citations

Sources

Lists of listed buildings in Lancashire
Buildings and structures in the Borough of Pendle